Natasha Rastogi (born Natasha Khanna; 14 May 1962) is an Indian actress and director.

She started her acting career by debuting in Monsoon Wedding as Sona Verma, directed by Mira Nair, that won the Golden Lion award and received a Golden Globe Award nomination.  She has played many roles on screen and on stage. She was awarded the Best Actress Award in Mahindra Excellence in Theatre Awards 2007 for Nati Binodini, directed by Amal Allana. She appeared in Do Dooni Chaar as Salma in 2010. She has acted in the TV series Gulaal as Panbaa.

Early life
Natasha was born in a Hindu family to Rachna Khanna and Dr. Triloki Nath Khanna, a Professor of Hindi in Zakir Husain College, Delhi. She skipped the clichéd course in drama/acting and broadened her artistic vision by doing a Bachelor's in Art from the College of Art, Delhi.

Career
Natasha started her career as a drama teacher in Modern School (New Delhi) in 1992. As a part of her job, she was assigned the responsibility of directing and choreographing plays including the signature event, valedictory function. She  choreographed musical ballets involving 280 students for 12 years.  Some of these plays were namely Nav Prabhat, Spring –The Reawakening, Swarnim Vriksh, Amrit Manthan, Sunderland Mein Alice, Ek Aur Panchtantra, Ek Aur Ek Gyarah, Sunoh Kahani, Wings of Desire and Dhun ka Jadoogar.  Working with everyone involved in the play, from costume designer to script writer, from makeup artist to music director, she honed her skills as an artist.

After 12 years of service, Natasha joined Amal Alana's theater group. Since then she has been a part of a theater group that has travelled across the globe doing plays in places like London, Mexico, Lahore and including every metropolitan city in India.

Filmography

Films

Television

Commercial Ads

References

External links
 
 

1962 births
Living people
Indian film actresses
Indian television actresses
Actresses in Hindi cinema
21st-century Indian actresses
People from Delhi
Delhi University alumni